Varsity Stadium is an outdoor collegiate football stadium located in Toronto, Ontario, Canada. It is home to the Toronto Varsity Blues, the athletic teams of the University of Toronto. Athletic events have been hosted on the site since 1898; the current stadium was built in 2007 to replace the original permanent stadium built in 1911. Varsity Stadium is also a former home of the Toronto Argonauts, and has previously hosted the Grey Cup, the Vanier Cup, several matches of the 1976 Summer Olympics soccer tournament, and the final game of the North American Soccer League's 1984 Soccer Bowl series (which was also the last game played by the original NASL). It is located next to Varsity Arena.

History
Athletic teams of the University of Toronto have used the site as an athletic ground since 1898. In 1911, the university opened Varsity Stadium.

First stadium
Canadian sprinter Percy Williams set a world record in the 100 metres with a time of 10.3 seconds at Varsity Stadium during the Canadian Track and Field Championships in 1930.

Varsity Stadium has for its entire history been host to the University of Toronto's collegiate Canadian football team, the Varsity Blues. However it was, until the opening of Exhibition Stadium in 1959, the home of the Toronto Argonauts of what would become the Canadian Football League.  Although it has not hosted a meaningful CFL game in almost half a century, it still holds the record for the number of times any stadium has hosted the Canadian professional football championship game, the Grey Cup. Capacity of the stadium has varied with time, but peaked at about 22,000 in the 1950s although, with the use of temporary bleachers, a record crowd of 27,425 watched the Edmonton Eskimos defeat the Montreal Alouettes 50–27 in the 1956 Grey Cup final. Perhaps the most famous Canadian football game played in the Stadium was the 1950 Mud Bowl for the Grey Cup championship.

During the 1976 Summer Olympics, Varsity Stadium hosted several soccer matches, and was the site of the semi-final game between Brazil and Poland.

The NASL's Toronto Metros-Croatia used Varsity Stadium through 1978, before moving to Exhibition Stadium. They returned six years later as the Toronto Blizzard and again made it their home for the 1984 season. On October 3, 1984, before 16,842 fans, the last game ever contested in the original North American Soccer League was played at Varsity Stadium when the Chicago Sting defeated the Blizzard 3–2 to win the deciding game of 1984 Soccer Bowl Series. The NASL would fold before the start of the next season.

In mid-1986, Varsity Stadium played host to the World Lacrosse Championships, a tournament featuring the United States, Canada, England, and Australia. The US defeated Canada in the final, 18–9.

The new Toronto Blizzard returned to Varsity in 1987 as part of the Canadian Soccer League but would move to the smaller Centennial Park Stadium as a cost-cutting move. They returned in 1993 as a member of the American Professional Soccer League but again were forced to move, this time to Lamport Stadium, again due to financial difficulties. Varsity Stadium continued to host the Canadian intercollegiate championship, the Vanier Cup (as it had been for most years from 1965–1988 [with exception of 1973–75]), but that too moved to larger quarters such as SkyDome (now known as Rogers Centre) as the popularity of the collegiate championship grew.

Canada's national soccer team played several matches at Varsity Stadium, including crucial World Cup qualifying matches versus Costa Rica in 1985 and Mexico in 1993. Friendly matches versus Germany and the Netherlands were also staged in 1994.

Minor league professional soccer team Toronto Lynx moved into the stadium in 1997 but was forced to move to Centennial Park Stadium due to the impending demolition of the historic facility.

The stadium was demolished mid-2002 after the cost of maintaining the large facility was far more than it generated in revenue. At that time, several structural sections of the stadium were being held up by temporary repairs, and the future integrity of the structure was in question. The field and track were retained after the demolition. During the demolition and re-building of the site Toronto Varsity Blues relocated to Birchmount Stadium in Scarborough.

Second stadium

From 2003 through 2005, temporary seating of about 1,500 was installed to permit the use of the field for intercollegiate games. The name Varsity Field was used from 2002 to 2006 during the period when the old stadium was demolished and the new stadium was being built.

A plan to build a new 25,000 seat multi-purpose stadium on the site in 2005 was voted down by the governing council of the University of Toronto due to concerns over its cost. The facility was then planned to be built on the grounds of York University but that too failed. At the time of its demolition, Varsity Stadium was the second largest capacity stadium in Canada with a grass field, after Commonwealth Stadium in Edmonton, Alberta (however, that stadium has since switched to an artificial playing surface).  The stadium opened in 2007.

Facilities and features built in the first phase of the stadium's reconstruction include an IAAF Class II 400m eight-lane track, artificial field turf (FIFA 2 Star rated surface by Polytan), and a winter bubble enabling use during inclement weather. The multi-use capability was one of the main reasons that the plan was passed by the governing council, as opposed to the 25,000 seat stadium. Compared to the old Varsity Stadium, the seating is closer to Varsity Arena, almost making the two structures one conjoined complex. Part of the red brick wall along Bloor Street was maintained for historic purposes, but the new facility is much more open and visible from the streets overall. The new facilities are designed by Diamond and Schmitt Architects.

Following the renovation, the Argonauts returned to the stadium, hosting their 2013 preseason game at their former home.  Their 2014 and 2015 preseason home games were also scheduled for the stadium.

For the 2015 Pan American Games the facility hosted archery between July 14 and 18. During the games, the facility was configured to hold roughly 2,000 spectators per session. The facility also hosted the archery events of the 2015 Parapan American Games

Major events

In addition to hosting several University of Toronto athletic programs, the stadium has also hosted several events including military, musical, and sporting games.

Music

The stadium has also been host to several concerts most notably the 1969 Rock 'n Roll Revival Concert, which Rolling Stone once called the second most important event in rock & roll history and resulted in a documentary movie, Sweet Toronto, and John Lennon's Live Peace In Toronto album. The performers were The Doors, Plastic Ono Band (Lennon, Yoko Ono, and Eric Clapton, with Klaus Voormann and Alan White), Bo Diddley, Chicago Transit Authority (later renamed "Chicago"), Tony Joe White, Alice Cooper, Jerry Lee Lewis, Chuck Berry, Cat Mother & the All Night Newsboys, Gene Vincent, Junior Walker & the All Stars, Little Richard, Doug Kershaw, Screaming Lord Sutch, Nucleus, Milkwood, and Whiskey Howl.

KISS performed at the stadium during their Destroyer Tour on September 6, 1976. Rush performed at the stadium on September 2, 1979 during their Permanent Waves Warm-up Tour.

Sports

See also

 Birchmount Stadium – City of Toronto
 Centennial Park Stadium – City of Toronto
 Lamport Stadium – City of Toronto
 Monarch Park Stadium – Toronto District School Board
 Metro Toronto Track and Field Centre – City of Toronto
 Rosedale Field – City of Toronto
 York Lions Stadium – York University

References

External links

 

University of Toronto buildings
Canadian Football League venues
Soccer venues in Ontario
Sports venues in Toronto
Venues of the 1976 Summer Olympics
Olympic football venues
Toronto Argonauts
Multi-purpose stadiums in Canada
Venues of the 2015 Parapan American Games
North American Soccer League (1968–1984) stadiums
University sports venues in Canada
Ultimate (sport) venues
College football venues
Canadian football venues in Ontario
Archery venues